Orthogonius elisabethanus is a species of ground beetle in the subfamily Orthogoniinae. Burgeon described it in 1937.

References

elisabethanus
Beetles described in 1937